Chantelle Cameron vs Mary McGee, billed as "The Road to Undisputed", was a professional boxing match contested between WBC female light-welterweight champion, Chantelle Cameron, and IBF female light-welterweight champion, Mary McGee, with the inaugural Ring magazine title also on the line. The bout took place on 30 October 2021 at The O2 Arena in London. Cameron defeated McGee via unanimous decision.

Background
McGee won the vacant IBF female title in December 2019 after defeating Ana Laura Esteche via tenth-round technical knockout in New York. Following a successful defence of her title, McGee was scheduled to face Victoria Bustos in a unification bout with the vacant WBO female title also on the line. However, the bout was cancelled after McGee suffered an injury during training.

Cameron defeated Adriana Araújo via unanimous decision to capture the vacant WBC female title in October 2020, followed by a successful defence against Melissa Hernández in May 2021. In September, a four-woman light-welterweight championship tournament was announced for 30 October. Billed as "Road to Undisputed", the tournament was an attempt to crown an undisputed champion, seeing Cameron face McGee for the WBC and IBF titles while WBA champion Kali Reis faced Jessica Camara, with the vacant WBO title also on the line.

Fight card

References

2021 in boxing
2021 in British sport
October 2021 sports events in the United Kingdom
2021 sports events in London
International sports competitions in London